Sound of Thunder or A Sound of Thunder may refer to:

"A Sound of Thunder", a science fiction short story by Ray Bradbury
A Sound of Thunder (film), an adaptation of the story
A Sound of Thunder (band), an American heavy metal band
A Sound of Thunder (video game), based on the film
The Sound of Thunder, a novel by Wilbur Smith
The Sound of Thunder (film), a 1957 Australian television play
"Sound of Thunder", a single from Duran Duran (1981 album), and inspired by the short story
"The Sound of Thunder", an episode of the second season of Star Trek: Discovery